AEK Athens Football Club (Αθλητική Ένωσις Κωνσταντινουπόλεως; Athlitikí Énosis Konstantinoupόleos, meaning Athletic Union of Constantinople) is a Greek professional football club based in Nea Filadelfeia, a suburb of Athens, Greece.

Established in Nea Filadelfeia, in 1924 by Greek refugees from Constantinople in the wake of the Greco-Turkish War (1919–1922), AEK is one of the three most successful teams in Greek football (including Olympiacos and Panathinaikos), winning 30 national titles and the only one
to have won all the competitions organised by the Hellenic Football Federation (12 Championships, 15 Greek Cups, 1 League Cup and 2 Super Cups).

The club has appeared several times in European competitions (UEFA Champions League, UEFA Europa League and the defunct UEFA Cup Winners' Cup). It is the only Greek team that advanced to 
the semi-finals of the UEFA Cup (1976–77) and the quarter-finals of the UEFA Cup Winners' Cup twice (1996–97 and 1997–98).
AEK was also the first Greek team that advanced to the quarter-finals of the European Cup (1968–69) and also to the group stage of the UEFA Champions League (1994–95).

History

Establishment and early years (1924–1944)

The large Greek population of Constantinople, not unlike those of the other Ottoman urban centres, continued its athletic traditions in the form of numerous athletic clubs. Clubs such as Énosis Tatávlon and Iraklís from the Tatavla district, Mégas Aléxandros and Ermís of Galata, and Olympiás of Therapia existed to promote Hellenic athletic and cultural ideals. These were amongst a dozen Greek-backed clubs that dominated the sporting landscape of the city in the years preceding World War I. After the war, with the influx of mainly French and British soldiers to Constantinople, many of the city's clubs participated in regular competitions with teams formed by foreign troops. Taxim, Pera, and Tatavla became the scene of weekly competitions in not only football, but also athletics, cycling, boxing, and tennis.

Of the clubs in the city, football was dominated by Énosis Tatávlon and Ermís. Ermís, one of the most popular sports clubs, was formed in 1875 by the Greek community of Pera (Galata). Known as "Pera" since the mid-1880s, and "The Greek Football Team" when its football department was formed in 1914, it was forced to change its name to "Pera Sports Club", and then "Beyoğluspor Kulübü" in 1923. Many of its athletes, and those of most other sporting clubs, fled during the population exchanges at the end of the Greco-Turkish War, and settled in Athens and Thessaloniki.

In 1924, the founders of AEK – a group of Constantinopolitan refugees (among them former athletes from the Pera Sports Club and the other Constantinopolitan clubs) – met at the athletic shop "Lux" of Emilios Ionas and Konstantinos Dimopoulos on Veranzerou Street, in the centre of Athens, and created AEK. Their intention was to create a club that provided athletic and cultural diversions for the thousands of predominantly Constantinopolitan and Anatolian refugees who had settled in the new suburbs of Athens (including Nea Filadelfeia, Nea Ionia, Nea Chalkidona, Nea Smyrni).

The first team of AEK was: GK: Kitsos, DF: Ieremiadis, DF: Asderis, MF: Kechagias, MF: Paraskevas, MF: Dimopoulos, MF: Karagiannides, FW: Baltas, FW: Milas, FW: Iliades, and FW: Georgiades. AEK played its first match against Aias Athinon in November 1924, winning 2–0.

AEK's football team grew rapidly in popularity during the 1920s, eclipsing the already-established Athens-based refugee clubs (Panionios, Apollon Smyrnis etc.), thanks mainly to the large pool of immigrants that were drawn to the club, the significance of the name "Constantinople" for many refugees and Greeks, plus, in no small part, to the political connections and wealth of several of the club's board members. Not possessing a football ground, AEK played most of its early matches at various locations around Athens, including the grounds of the Temple of Olympian Zeus and the Leoforos Alexandras Stadium.

AEK's first president, Konstantinos Spanoudis (1871–1941), a journalist and associate of the Prime Minister Eleftherios Venizelos, petitioned the government to set aside land for the establishment of a sports ground. In 1926, land in Nea Filadelfeia which was originally set aside for refugee housing, was donated as a training ground for the refugees' sports activities. AEK began using the ground for training, albeit unofficially.

In 1928, Panathinaikos, Olympiacos and AEK began a dispute with the fledgling Hellenic Football Federation (EPO), decided to break away from the Athens regional league, and formed an alliance called POK (from their initial letters, K was for AEK: Konstantinoupόleos). During the dispute, POK organised friendly matches against each other and several continental European clubs. In 1929, though, the dispute ended and AEK, along with the other POK clubs, entered the EPO fold once again.

In 1930, the property where AEK trained was officially signed over to the club. Venizelos soon approved the plans to build what was to become AEK's home ground for the next 70 years, the Nikos Goumas Stadium. The first home game, in November 1930, was an exhibition match against Olympiacos that ended in a 2–2 draw.

In 1932, AEK won their first Greek Cup title, beating Aris 5–3 in the final. The team boasted a number of star football players like Kostas Negrepontis (a veteran of the original Pera Club of Constantinople), Kleanthis Maropoulos, Tryfon Tzanetis, Michalis Delavinias, Giorgos Mageiras, and Spyros Sklavounos.

The club's mixed success during the 1930's was highlighted by the first Greek Championship and Greek Cup (making the Double) in 1939. Under former player Kostas Negrepontis as head coach, AEK also won the Greek Championship of 1940.

1960–1974: Nestoridis-Papaioannou era

With Kostas Nestoridis scoring goals in the early 1960's (top goalscorer for 5 seasons in row, from 1958 to 1963), and the timely signing of attacker Mimis Papaioannou (all-time top goalscorer and appearances recordman of the club) in 1962, AEK went on to win the 1962–63 championship. Known affectionately as "Mimis" by the AEK supporters, Papaioannou scored twice in the 1963 playoff against Panathinaikos, levelling the scores at 3–3 and giving AEK its first post-war championship on goal aggregate. Coached by Hungarian-German Jenő Csaknády, the championship team also consisted of Stelios Serafidis, Miltos Papapostolou, and Andreas Stamatiadis. Youngsters like Alekos Sofianidis, Stelios Skevofilakas, Giorgos Petridis and Manolis Kanellopoulos also played a significant role in the victorious 1963 campaign.

The club followed up with Cup victories in 1964 and 1966. With the return of Csaknády to the coach's position in 1968 and with the addition of some great players like Kostas Nikolaidis, Giorgos Karafeskos, Panagiotis Ventouris, Fotis Balopoulos, Spyros Pomonis, Alekos Iordanou, Nikos Stathopoulos and Andreas Papaemmanouil, AEK easily won the championship of 1967–68.

European Champions Cup quarter-finalists
In the 1968–69 season AEK, with new Serbian coach Branko Stanković, became the first Greek football club to reach the quarter-finals of the European Champions Cup, but were eliminated by the Czechoslovakian Spartak Trnava.

The addition of goalkeeper Stelios Konstantinidis and Apostolos Toskas reinforced the team, and allowed AEK to take their fifth championship title in 1971.

AEK also won the unofficial Greek Super Cup of 1971, beating Olympiacos 4–2 on penalty kicks after 2 draws (2–2 at Piraeus and 1–1 at Nea Filadelfeia). Mavros, Eleftherakis, and Ardizoglou were part of the AEK outfit that dominated the Greek league in the late 1970's.

1974–81: The great AEK of Barlos

Loukas Barlos, a successful industrialist, took over the presidency and financial support of AEK in 1974, and with the help of coach František Fadrhonc built one of the finest teams in the club's history. The Barlos "Golden Era" saw some of the greatest players ever to have played for AEK: Christos Ardizoglou, Giorgos Dedes, Giorgos Skrekis, the Germans Walter Wagner and Timo Zahnleiter, Dionysis Tsamis, Pantelis Nikolaou, Petros Ravousis, Dušan Bajević, Takis Nikoloudis, Stefanos Theodoridis, Babis Intzoglou and Nikos Christidis.

UEFA Cup semi-finalists

Captained by Papaioannou in the 1976–1977 season, AEK reached the semi-finals of the UEFA Cup competition, the first Greek football club to do so. Beating Dynamo Moscow (Russia) 2–0, Derby County (U.K.) 2–0 and 3–2, Red Star Belgrade (Yugoslavia) 2–0, and QPR (U.K.) 3–0 and 7–6 on penalties, AEK were eventually eliminated by Gianni Agnelli's Juventus. Juventus went on to win their first European title.

Thomas Mavros: a goal-machine

It was during this period that AEK signed one of Greece's finest strikers, Thomas Mavros, the all-time top goalscorer in the Greek Championship. In the following years, he and Dušan Bajević formed a formidable attacking duo for AEK. Mavros was an integral part of the team that reached the UEFA Cup semi-final in 1976, but it was his devastating form (top goal scorer of 1978 and 1979 – 22 and 31 goals, respectively) that helped AEK to win the 1977–78 Championship-Cup double. The addition of former Panathinaikos stars Domazos and Eleftherakis to the AEK roster, the following year, saw the club cap off their most successful decade to date by winning the 1979 Championship.

Under the leadership of Loukas Barlos, the Nikos Goumas Stadium was finally completed with the addition of the iconic covered stand, or Skepasti, which eventually became home to the most fanatic of AEK supporter groups, "Original 21". The next generation of star players, fresh out of AEK's Academy, made their debut during this period: Stelios Manolas, Spyros Ikonomopoulos, Vangelis Vlachos, and Lysandros Georgamlis.

1981–1999
With new president Michalis Arkadis and Austrian head coach Helmut Senekowitsch, AEK won the 1983 Greek Cup, beating PAOK 2–0 in the newly built Athens Olympic Stadium. Thomas Mavros and Vangelis Vlachos were the goalscorers.

AEK also chased the elusive Championship title and it finally came in 1989. Coached by former player Dušan Bajević, AEK clinched the title after a winning a crucial match 1–0 against Olympiacos at the Athens Olympic Stadium. Takis Karagiozopoulos scored the goal that gave AEK its first Championship after ten years. AEK won also the Greek Super Cup of 1989, beating Panathinaikos on penalties after the match ended in a 1–1 draw.

Bajević golden team: Three consecutive championships
After the 1989 triumphs, under Bajević, AEK built what was to become one of the most successful teams in its history. Captained by Stelios Manolas, the team, which included Toni Savevski, Daniel Batista, Vaios Karagiannis, Vasilis Dimitriadis, Giorgos Savvidis, Alexis Alexandris, Vasilis Tsiartas, Michalis Kasapis, Refik Šabanadžović and Vasilis Borbokis dominated the Greek league through the 1990s with three successive Championship titles (1992, 1993, and 1994). AEK won the only Greek League Cup ever organised in 1990 (beating Olympiacos 3–2).

First Greek presence in the UEFA Champions League group stage

In 1994–95, AEK was the first Greek football club that participated in the group stage of the UEFA Champions League after defeating Scottish champions Rangers; AEK was eliminated by Ajax Amsterdam and AC Milan, who made it to the final. With Michalis Trochanas as president and Dušan Bajević as coach, the club won the Greek Cup in 1996.

Former player Petros Ravousis took over the coaching position when Dušan Bajević defected to Olympiacos at the end of 1996. Ravousis led the team to its second Super Cup in 1996, and its eleventh Cup title in 1997, beating Panathinaikos in both finals.

By far AEK's most successful run with titles, the period also saw the club sign Temur Ketsbaia and several young, talented players like Demis Nikolaidis, Christos Kostis, Christos Maladenis and Akis Zikos. Nikolaidis, in particular, an AEK fan since childhood, declined more lucrative offers from Olympiacos and Panathinaikos to sign for his beloved club. During the 1996–97 and 1997–98 seasons, AEK progressed to the quarter-finals of the UEFA Cup Winners' Cup, where they were eliminated by Paris Saint-Germain and Lokomotiv Moscow.

In 1999, ex-president Dimitris Melissanidis organised a friendly match against FK Partizan in Belgrade, during the height of the NATO bombing of Serbia. As a gesture of compassion and solidarity towards the embattled Serbs, the AEK players and management staff defied the international embargo and traveled to Belgrade for the match. The game ended 1–1, when after 60 minutes thousands of Serbian football fans invaded the pitch to embrace the footballers.

21st century
AEK won its twelfth Cup title in 2000 under coach Giannis Pathiakakis, defeating Ionikos 3–0 in the final (37' Nikolaidis, 77' Petkov, 82' Maladenis). The club continued its consistency in the Championship of 2001–02, finishing second by goal aggregate to Olympiacos, and beating Olympiacos in the Greek Cup final.

2002–03 UEFA Champions League unbeaten run

Dušan Bajević returned as coach in the summer of 2002, a move that sparked open hostility towards Bajević from a section of AEK supporters. A strong team, called Dream Team by the fans, was created with players like Kostas Katsouranis, Ilija Ivić, Dionysis Chiotis, Vasilios Borbokis, Grigoris Georgatos, Theodoros Zagorakis, Walter Centeno, Michalis Kapsis, Michel Kreek, Vasilios Lakis, Vasilios Tsiartas (who returned from Sevilla), Ioannis Okkas, Nikos Liberopoulos and Demis Nikolaidis.

Under Bajević, AEK progressed through the qualifying rounds in the 2002 UEFA Champions League by eliminating APOEL. Drawn in Group A with AS Roma, Real Madrid, and Racing Genk, AEK with good performances drew all their games and were knocked out of the competition. They continued to UEFA Cup, eliminating Maccabi Haifa (4–0, 4–1) before being knocked out by Málaga CF.

Off the field, president Makis Psomiadis (died 6 January 2016) caused many problems for AEK and with his mismanagement overcharged the club. Also, with the assistance of his bodyguards, he allegedly assaulted captain Demis Nikolaidis and other players.

After the altercation, and partly due to the club's growing financial problems, Nikolaidis was let on free transfer by mutual consent to Atlético Madrid. Unable to cope with the negativity from a large section of AEK fans, Bajević resigned in 2004 after a match against Iraklis.

Demis Nikolaidis era
In 2004, Demis Nikolaidis and other significant AEK followers formed a supporters' club Enosis 1924 (Union 1924) to motivate all AEK supporters into taking up the club's shares and governance. The project was not fully realised because, in the meantime, various businessmen decided to buy shares and invest money in the club. However, to this date, Enosis 1924's chairman is a member of the AEK FC board. The same year, Nikos Goumas Stadium, AEK's home stadium for over 70 years was demolished, because a big part of it was damaged from 1999 Athens earthquake.

In 2004, on the back of strong AEK fan support, Nikolaidis, at the head of a consortium of businessmen, bought out the beleaguered club and became the new president. His primary task was to lead AEK out of its precarious financial position. The first success was an arrangement through the Greek judicial system to write off most of the massive debt that previous club administrators had amassed and to repay any remaining public debts in manageable instalments.

Securing the club's existence in the Alpha Ethniki, Nikolaidis then began a program to rebuild AEK to its former glory. He appointed experienced former player Ilija Ivić as technical director and brought back Fernando Santos as a coach. The AEK fans, emboldened by Nikolaidis' efforts, followed suit by buying season ticket packages in record numbers (over 17,000).

AEK recruited promising young players to strengthen a depleted team. Led by the experienced Katsouranis and Liberopoulos, and featuring Brazilian Júlio César, the club made it to the Greek Cup final for the seventh time in 13 years but finished second in the Championship, and in the process, secured a place in the third qualifying round of the UEFA Champions League. For the 2006–07 season, former Real Betis coach Lorenzo Serra Ferrer was appointed to the coaching position after Fernando Santos' contract was not renewed.

By beating Hearts over both legs (2–1 in Scotland and 3–0 in Greece), AEK progressed to the group stage of the Champions League. The club obtained a total of 8 points, having beaten AC Milan 1–0, Lille 1–0, and managing two draws with Anderlecht (1–1 in Greece and 2–2 in Belgium). AEK finished second in the Greek Super League, qualifying again for the third round in the UEFA Champions League.

2007–08 Championship controversy

For the 2007–08 season AEK changed kit sponsors from Adidas to Puma. They played with Sevilla FC in the UEFA Champions League third qualifying round. The first leg was played on 15 August, away at the Ramón Sánchez Pizjuán, where AEK was defeated by 2 goals, and the second leg played on 3 September, at the Athens Olympic Stadium where AEK lost again by 1–4.

AEK completed the signings of Brazilian legend Rivaldo, after he was let free from Olympiacos, Rodolfo Arruabarrena, Charis Pappas, and Argentine striker Ismael Blanco. Traianos Dellas was rewarded with a new contract, keeping him at the club until summer 2009. On 25 August, the Super League and EPO decided to postpone the opening season's games due to the fire disaster in the Peloponnese.

After being eliminated from the UEFA Champions League, AEK were drawn to play against FC Salzburg for the UEFA Cup. On 20 September, in Athens, AEK defeated FC Salzburg 3–0. In the second leg, played in Salzburg on 4 October, AEK lost the match but still went through 3–1 on aggregate. On 9 October, AEK were drawn in Group C in the UEFA Cup group stage along with Villarreal, Fiorentina, Mladá Boleslav, and Elfsborg. On 25 October, AEK kicked off the group stage with a 1–1 draw away to Elfsborg. On 29 November, AEK again drew 1–1, this time at home to Fiorentina. On 5 December, AEK won Mladá Boleslav 1–0 away and on 20 December, AEK was home defeated 1–2 by Villarreal CF, but finally booked a place in the knockout stage of the UEFA Cup by finishing third in the group. They were then drawn against Getafe CF in the third round (phase of 32). AEK advanced to the third round of UEFA Cup for the second consecutive season.

On 12 February, AEK parted company with Lorenzo Serra Ferrer after a poor run of form and unsuccessful signings and replaced him with former player Nikos Kostenoglou, on a caretaker basis. The team initially finished in first place in the league, but after the court case between Apollon Kalamarias and Olympiacos for the illegal usage of a player in the 1–0 Apollon Kalamarias win earlier in the season, Olympiacos was awarded 3 points, thus finishing 2 points ahead of AEK.

President Demis Nikolaidis and several other managers and chairmen were angered with the court's decision, stating that the Hellenic Football Federation knew about the usage of the illegal player prior to the game and had indeed issued a registration (blue card), but didn't do anything about it. Panathinaikos also challenged the result at the Court of Arbitration in Sport (CAS) with no success, as the Hellenic Federation did not support the claim. Rivaldo had stated his intention to leave Greece if the ruling went in favour of Olympiacos and AEK were not declared champions. He stated, "a team that was not good enough to win the title on the pitch does not deserve the trophy".

Giorgos Donis was appointed head coach of AEK on 14 May. His reign at the club did not go well. It all began when AEK failed to surpass AC Omonia in the UEFA Cup second qualifying round, which meant their elimination from European competitions for the season. Rivaldo asked to leave the club to sign for Bunyodkor on 27 August.

The league campaign started very well after a win over rivals Panathinaikos in the opening game of the season, but poor performances and results from then on left AEK in a difficult situation. Head coach Donis was eager to leave the club, but president Nikolaidis did not allow him to leave. Nevertheless, Nikolaidis left due to disappointing results and after a controversy with the club's supporters, Original 21, leaving the presidency temporarily to the members of the board of directors, Nikos Koulis, and Takis Kanellopoulos.

Financial problems and relegation

However, the series of disappointing results continued, bringing anger and insecure situations for everyone on the team. The first to be hit by this wave of disappointment and upset with the team council was coach Donis, who was asked to leave the team. On 21 November 2008, AEK hired Dušan Bajević as head coach for third time. However, after a while, Takis Kanellopoulos left the club, as he sparked a rivalry with Bajević.

On 4 February 2009, Nikos Thanopoulos was elected as the 41st president of AEK FC. Bajević brought some much-needed stability to the club, and performances on the pitch improved vastly towards the end of the season, culminating in AEK's progression to the Greek Cup final against Olympiacos which was played on 2 May 2009, at Athens Olympic Stadium. AEK lost in the final 14–15 on penalties. AEK finished the regular season in fourth position, thus qualifying for the season's playoffs, in which they eventually finished second, just missing out on UEFA Champions League qualification.

In the summer transfer period of 2010, AEK, despite being low on budget, managed to reinforce its ranks with many notable players. Club idols Nikos Liberopoulos and Traianos Dellas signed the last one-year contracts of their careers, and many new and experienced players signed to AEK, the most notable of whom were Papa Bouba Diop, Cristian Nasuti, and Christos Patsatzoglou. AEK qualified for the 2010–11 Europa League group stage after defeating Dundee United 2–1 on aggregate.

On 7 October 2010, Manolo Jiménez agreed to a two-year deal and took over for Bajević.

On 30 April 2011, AEK won the Greek Cup for the 14th time, defeating 3–0 Atromitos at the final.

To compensate for the departures of Nacho Scocco, Papa Bouba Diop, Sebastián Saja, and Ismael Blanco in the summer of 2011, AEK signed the captain of Iceland Eiður Guðjohnsen, and Colombian international Fabián Vargas. Due to financial problems, on 25 June 2012, AEK's legend Thomas Mavros took the club's management and on 1 August 2012, became president in an effort to save the club from financial disaster. Many other former AEK players like Vasilis Tsiartas, Mimis Papaioannou, Kostas Nestoridis, Christos Kostis, Vangelis Vlachos, Christos Arvanitis, and Giorgos Karafeskos were hired to help the club return to its previous glory days. Due to bad results, on 30 September 2012, Vangelis Vlachos was fired and Ewald Lienen hired as AEK's head coach. On 9 April 2013, Lienen was fired after disappointing results and AEK hired Traianos Dellas as head coach with Vasilis Borbokis and Akis Zikos for assistants.

On 19 April 2013, a Super League disciplinary committee voted to remove 3 points from AEK and award Panthrakikos a 3–0 win, after fans stormed the pitch and chased players from the field during the AEK–Panthrakikos match on 14 April 2013. As a result, AEK were relegated from the Super League to the second-tier Football League for the first time in their history. In addition, AEK were to start their Football League campaign with minus 2 points.

Melissanidis return to ownership

On 7 June 2013, during an AEK council, it was decided that AEK FC would become an amateur football club and would not participate in the Football League division for the 2013–14 season, preferring instead, to self-relegate and participate in the Football League 2 division and start from scratch. On the same day Dimitris Melissanidis, the former president of the club, became administrative leader of the club, under the supervision of Amateur AEK, with the aim of saving the club. Along with other notable AEK fans and old players, they went on to create the non-profit association Independent Union of Friends of AEK (Anexártiti Énosi Fίlon AEK) which took the majority stake of the football club.

AEK began its revival by signing Traianos Dellas as their new head coach. Dellas led AEK to first place in the third national division with a record of 23 wins, 3 draws, and only one defeat. The following year AEK participated in the 2014–15 Football League, finishing first and undefeated in the regular season standings. AEK successfully finished first in the playoffs and gained promotion back to the top tier, the Greek Super League. The biggest transfer in the club after returning to the Greek Super League was the Argentinian star Diego Buonanotte, who only stayed at the club for a year.

On 20 October 2015, Traianos Dellas was forced to resign as a result of a dispute with the board, and a heavy 4–0 away loss to Olympiacos. Stelios Manolas was named interim coach and later Gus Poyet was appointed as new head coach. On 19 April, Poyet was fired by AEK Athens after being accused by the board for revealing private club conversations. Stelios Manolas took charge as interim coach once again. Manolas managed to guide AEK to a 3rd-place finish in the league qualifying for the playoff round and also to their first piece of silverware since the 2010–11 season by lifting the Greek Cup, defeating Olympiacos in the final 2–1. With the postponement of the final on two separate occasions and the congested fixture list of the playoff round, it meant AEK were to play a fixture every three days, which evidently took its toll on the players, but they finished third in the playoffs and qualified for the 2016–17 UEFA Europa League Third Qualifying Round. The first season back in the top flight was considered a success with a trophy and qualification for European football next season, a return after a five-year hiatus.

The new season started with high expectations by AEK Athens fans as the club signed Dmytro Chyhrynskyi, Hugo Almeida and Joleon Lescott, announcing three of the biggest transfers in their history. Unfortunately, the 34-year-old English defender suffered a knee detached cartilage while cycling in his apartment. The injury ruled Lescott out for the remainder of the season. The player refused to get help from the team's doctors and insisted on completing his rehabilitation in the United Kingdom. The board did not agree to the player's wishes and additional demands, which resulted in his contract being terminated. This outcome led what it until then seemed to be a powerful defending duo to a midsummer night's nightmare. In addition, a 0–1 aggregate loss to AS Saint-Étienne in the Europa League qualifiers brought disappointment to fans' dreams of European participation. Nevertheless, AEK defeated Xanthi 4–1 in the first match of the season raising hopes for national distinction. However, the decision was made to replace Temur Ketsbaia with José Morais; the decision was based on the team's stuttering start to the season, 3 wins, 2 draws and 2 losses, and poor displays. José's arrival, however, did not improve the team's results or performances, winning only three of his fourteen matches as manager. On 19 January 2017 former manager Manolo Jiménez was appointed as manager for the second time following José's resignation. Upon his appointment he got the team from 7th place up to a 4th-place finish, and first place in the European Playoffs, claiming second place in the league overall and qualifying for the UEFA Champions League Third qualifying round. Jiménez also guided the team to a second consecutive Greek Cup final where they faced PAOK in a controversial game marred by pre-match violence between the two sets of fans and a winning goal from an offside position.

UEFA Europa League unbeaten run and Greek champions

The third season back in the top flight began with a tough draw in the Champions League Third qualifying round versus CSKA Moscow losing 3–0 on aggregate. The loss meant AEK were demoted to the Europa League play-off round where they were pitted versus Belgians Club Brugge. A 0–0 draw in Brugge in the first leg and a 3–0 win in the return in Athens meant that AEK qualified for the group stages of a major European competition for the first time in 6 years. They were seeded in pot 4 and were drawn along with AC Milan, HNK Rijeka and Austria Wien. AEK would go on to qualify for the round of 32 undefeated, a statement that solidified their return as one of Europe's elite teams, with a record of 1 win and 5 draws, the most notable being the two back-to-back 0–0 draws versus AC Milan. In the Round of 32 AEK were drawn against Ukrainian giants Dynamo Kyiv. AEK were better than their opponents, but also were unlucky and lost after two draws and on away goal rule. The first match took place in Athens, with a 1–1 draw and the second game in Kyiv, finished 0–0. In April, AEK won their 12th Greek championship, by recording a 2–0 home win against Levadiakos in front of 60,000 fans. This was their first championship after 24 years. AEK were crowned champions in front of 14,500 of their fans in the last matchday against Apollon Smyrnis at Georgios Kamaras Stadium.

UEFA Champions League return and consecutive Greek cup finals

2018–19 season was the season that AEK returned to the groups of the UEFA Champions League, for the 5th time in the club's history after eliminating Celtic (3–2 on aggregate) and MOL Vidi (3–2 on aggregate) in the qualifying stages.

Led by former Panathinaikos' manager, Marinos Ouzounidis, AEK were drawn in Group E against Bayern Munich, Benfica and Ajax but failed to make an impact after losing in all six occasions.

Key-players Jakob Johansson, Lazaros Christodoulopoulos, Sergio Araujo and Ognjen Vranješ as well as manager Manolo Jiménez that were essential to the 2017–18 triumphant season left the club and most transfers failed to add up to the team. Greek international Marios Oikonomou and Argentine striker Ezequiel Ponce were the only newcomers that managed to make an impact on an overall disappointing season (3rd place, 23 points behind 1st PAOK and 18 points behind 2nd Olympiacos – third consecutive cup final loss from PAOK, 1–0).

2017–18 season's champions, Ognjen Vranješ and Sergio Araujo returned to Athens, and some other notable additions are Portuguese international Nélson Oliveira and Serbian midfielder Nenad Krstičić. The 2019–20 season started catastrophically, with an early Europa League elimination from the Turkish side Trabzonspor (1–3 in Athens, 0–2 in Trabzon, 3–3 on aggregate) and disappointing domestic results. New manager, Miguel Cardoso was sacked quickly to be replaced with the club's veteran player and manager, Nikos Kostenoglou who was also later replaced by Italian manager, Massimo Carrera. 

Under Carrera, AEK regained the confidence lost from the previous 1,5 years of bad results. Before the lockdown caused by the COVID-19 pandemic, AEK was 3rd in the regular season and in the semi-finals of the Greek Cup (2–1 home victory against Aris in the first leg). Afterwards going on to make it to the final for the fifth time in a row. However, they lost the final 1–0 to Olympiacos.

After the draw for the Europa League third qualifying round, AEK Athens got VfL Wolfsburg at the Play-off round they won 2–1 at the Athens Olympic Stadium getting in the Group stage.
However, AEK's campaign results in the Europa League as well as the first half of the domestic Superleague were lacklustre, the European campaign being one of their worst ever, only recording 1 win in the group stages. In December, Massimo Carrera was relieved of his duties and replaced by Manolo Jiménez, previous Super League and Greek Cup winner with AEK – his fourth term at the club.

UEFA Europa Conference League disqualification, new stadium and top signings

Hoping to rebuild, AEK acquired the services of Vladan Milojevic. However, his tenure ended early, with AEK Athens being disqualified on penalties by Bosnia and Herzegovina club Velež Mostar in the 2021–22 Europa Conference League second qualifying round.

The newly built stadium is located in the place where the old Nikos Goumas stadium was situated, at Nea Filadelfeia. The Agia Sophia stadium, also known as OPAP Arena for sponsoring reasons, is a category 4 UEFA stadium and can host 30,500 spectators. The net construction cost is estimated around € 81,700,000. The administrative region of Attica funded the stadium with the amount of € 20,000,000. The stadium's opening ceremony took place on 30 September 2022. AEK Athens won Ionikos Nikaias 4–1 in their new stadium opening game on 3 October 2022, a game conducted for the sixth fixture of the 2022–23 Greek Super League. An interesting fact about the last goal scored in the old stadium and the first goal scored in the new stadium emerged after ten minutes of play in the Agia Sofia stadium. In the last game played in the demolished Nikos Goumas stadium, a Serbian midfielder called Ilija Ivić scored the last goal against Aris in a 4–0 win in favour of AEK Athens. This time a Serbian midfielder called Mijat Gaćinović scored the first goal in the opening game of the newly built stadium against Ionikos Nikaias in a 4–1 win in favour of AEK Athens.    

In the summer transfer window of the 2022–23 season, AEK Athens announced the signing of two famous football players who played as opponents in the 2018 FIFA World Cup final in Russia. The first player was the Croatian centre-back Domagoj Vida who previously played for Süper Lig side Beşiktaş, and the second player was the French right-back Djibril Sidibé who lastly played for Ligue 1 club Monaco. The latter is the most valuable player to have ever arrived at the club with a market value of € 8,000,000, surpassing the previous player Juanfran by € 2,000,000. Djibril Sidibé is also the fifth player to have won the FIFA World Cup that arrived in the Greek Superleague, after the French star Christian Karembeu and the Brazilian stars Rivaldo, Gilberto Silva and Denilson.

Crest

In 1924, AEK adopted the image of a double-headed eagle (Dikéfalos Aetós) as their emblem. Created by Greek refugees from Constantinople in the years following the Greco-Turkish War and subsequent population exchange, the emblem and colours (yellow and black) of AEK were chosen as a reminder of lost homelands; they represent the club's historical ties to Constantinople. The double-headed eagle is featured in the flag of the Greek Orthodox Church, whose headquarters are in Constantinople, and served as Imperial emblem under the Palaiologos dynasty, which was the last one to rule the Byzantine Empire.

AEK's main emblem underwent numerous minor changes between 1924 and 1982. The design of the eagle on the shirt badge was often not identical to the design of the eagle depicted on official club correspondence, merchandise, and promotional material. All designs were considered "official" (in the broadest sense of the word), however, it was not until 1982 that an identifiable, copyrighted design was established as the club's official, and shirt badge. The emblem design was changed in 1989, again in 1993, and again in 2013 to the current design.

Anthem of AEK

Kit and colours
The colours of yellow/gold and black were adopted from AEK's connections with Constantinople and the Byzantine Empire.

AEK have always worn predominantly gold or yellow shirts and black shorts. An exception has been the unusual, but notable and popular among the fans, Kappa kits of the '90s which featured a big two-headed eagle motif across the kit.

AEK's traditional away colours are all-black or all-white; on a few occasions, the club has introduced as a third kit a light blue, a silver, and even a dark red, or a tyrian purple (porphyra), a type of reddish purple, inspired by the war Byzantine flag and used also by the imperial dynasties of the Byzantine empire (Eastern Roman empire).

Shirt sponsors and manufacturers
Since 1 June 2021, AEK's kit has been manufactured by Nike. Previous manufacturers have been Adidas (1974–75, 1977–83 and 2005–07), Zita Hellas (1983–89), Diadora (1989–93), Basic (1993–95), Kappa (1995–2000), Puma (1975–77 and 2007–15) and Capelli (2018–21).

Starting in 2015, the club's main shirt sponsors are OPAP, which also sponsored them in 2010–14. Previous shirt sponsors have been Citizen (1982–83), Nissan (1983–85), Ethniki Asfalistiki (1985–93 and 1995–96), Phoenix Asfaleies (1993–95), Geniki Bank (1996–98), Firestone (1999), Marfin Investment Group (1999–2001), Alpha Digital (2001–02), Piraeus Bank (2002–04), TIM (2004–06), LG (2006–08), Diners Club (2009–10), and Jeep (2014–15).

Financial information
Loukas Barlos, a successful bauxite Mine Owner, was also owner and president since 1974, and was in charge when Greek football turned professional in 1979. In 1981, due to health problems, he passed his shares to Andreas Zafeiropoulos. In 1982 the business shipping magnate Michalis Arkadis became president, aiming to reinforce financial support, with Zafeiropoulos holding the majority stake. In 1988, Zafeiropoulos placed Efstratios Gidopoulos in the presidency, and AEK managed to win their first championship in ten years.

On 17 June 1992, the club passed to new owners. The business shipping magnate and oil tycoon Dimitris Melissanidis, together with Giannis Karras, took the majority stake and continued the successful and champion seasons.

After an unsuccessful season, in 1995, they passed their shares to Michalis Trochanas, and with his turn a percentage to ENIC Group investment company. In 1999, NETMED, a Dutch media company, took over management of the club. A crisis period followed with mismanagement and many changes in the presidency. In 2004, ex-AEK player Demis Nikolaidis made a plan to progress with the reorganization and financial consolidation, and together with other investors (such as Nicholas X. Notias, Gikas Goumas, Takis Kanellopoulos, a shareholder of Titan Cement, and others) took the majority stake.

The plan initially seemed to work, but the downfall continued. The team was relegated after the 2012–13 season for the first time in its history. In an effort to discharge the immense debt created by years of mismanagement, its directors chose for the team to compete in the third tier. On the same day Dimitris Melissanidis, the old president of the club, became administrative leader of AEK, under the supervision of the amateur AEK Later, together with other notable AEK fans and old players, they created the non-profit association "Union Friends of AEK" (Enosi Filon AEK) which took the majority stake of the football club.

In March 2015, AEK FC became the first Greek company that was listed in the Elite programme of the London Stock Exchange, a pan-European programme for ambitious high-growth businesses that was launched in 2012 at Borsa Italiana and following its success was rolled out in the UK in 2014, and the first Greek football club quoted on a stock exchange. Raffaele Jerusalmi, executive director of the board of directors of LSEG, stated: "We are delighted to welcome AEK to Elite programme". On 27 April 2015, AEK FC was selected for the honor of opening a session of the London Stock Exchange.

Current sponsorships:
Premium Sponsors: Pame Stoixima, Nike
Official Sponsors: Football Pro, Piraeus Bank, Cosmote, Cosmote TV, LG Corporation

Stadium

Nikos Goumas Stadium was a multi-purpose stadium in Nea Filadelfeia ("New Philadelphia"), a northwestern suburb of Athens, Greece. It was used mostly for football matches and was the home stadium of AEK FC. It was named after one-time club president, Nicholas Goumas, who contributed to its building and later upgrading. It served as AEK's home ground since 1930. The Nikos Goumas Stadium had severe damages from 1999's earthquake and in 2003 was demolished with the prospect to build a new stadium for AEK FC. Unfortunately, prolonged obstruction, legal issues and tight deadlines lapsed this prospect until recently. The club now plays its home games in the 70,000-capacity "Spyros Louis" (Athens Olympic Stadium) in Athens and currently builds its new stadium in the same place where Nikos Goumas Stadium used to stand. The Olympic Athletic Center of Athens, also known as OAKA, is one of the most complete European athletic complexes.

The Olympic Athletic Center of Athens hosted the Mediterranean Games in 1991, the World Championship in Athletics in 1997, the 1994 and 2007 UEFA Champions League Finals, as well as other important athletic and cultural events, the most significant of which remains the Summer Olympics in 2004.

Construction on an all-new purpose-built stadium began on 28 July 2017 in the site of the old Nikos Goumas stadium. It was completed in 2022 and the opening took place on 30th September 2022. The stadium has capacity of approximately 32,500 fans and features a unique underground road system that the teams will use to enter the stadium. Construction has suffered from major delays due to the local authorities taking too long on confirming certain proposals concerning the stadium's road system but construction of the system has finally begun as of March 2020.
 
The stadium's opening ceremony took place on 30 September 2022. AEK Athens won Ionikos Nikaias 4–1 in their new stadium opening game on 3 October 2022, a game conducted for the sixth fixture of the 2022–23 Greek Super League.

Training facility

Since December 2010, AEK has been using state-of-the-art facilities in an area of 144 acres in the Mazareko area in Spata. Previously owned by Nicholas X. Notias, it is the most expensive (with a total cost around €25m) and one of the biggest training centers in Greece. These facilities include two lawns with natural turf and one with plastic for the needs of the Academies (which was created in 2013 with a viewing platform for spectators) and all the necessary and well-equipped areas for the preparation of a team with modern instruments. A standard football studio, one of the most complete in Greece. The main building of the centre hosts offices of the club, a press room, and the players' rooms. The training ground is used by the first team and youth teams. The Spata Training Centre includes state-of-the-art facilities, a fitness and health centre with weight-training and fitness rooms, a cryotherapy centre and more. There are also plans for an AEK Museum, hotel, aquatic centre and two more soccer fields. From 2013 and on, AEK training centre services have been upgraded dramatically. The players of the teamwork daily in an environment with all the necessary infrastructure, while in the last few months they have at their disposal in the basement of the building a treatment centre with the most modern means. Even the young athletes of the Academies work in facilities that very few Academies have in Greece. But the outlook is even more impressive. Since 2014, the official name of the ground is "OPAP Sports Centre". On 4 July 2018, the Sports Centre came to auction which was bought by Dimitrios Melissanidis for a price of €3.5m and then donated it to AEK. Alongside the Sports Centre, Melissanidis also bought 70 hectares for an extra €5.5m which were added to the wider area of the existing training center and there will be additional stadiums along with the necessary additional facilities for the preparation of the team and for the hospitality of the players.

Supporters and rivalries

Support

AEK Athens has a large fan base across all of Greece and is the third most popular Greek football team in relation to their fan base. According to Sky Sports AEK have around 32% of all Greek football fans. AEK's fan base in Greece is believed to be over 2 million with various researches suggesting AEK have an estimated fan base between 2.5 – 2.7 million fans in Greece. AEK Athens traditional fanbase comes from the area of Nea Filadelfeia, where the club is based, as well as a good part of the rest of the Athens area.

AEK have a strong following in the Greek diaspora especially in Cyprus where the club has a large following with a recent fan poll from Kerkida.net having AEK as the second most popular Greek supported team in Cyprus behind Panathinaikos (34%) but ahead of Olympiacos (23%) with AEK having 27% of Cypriot football fans supporting the club. One of the main reasons AEK's popularity in Cyprus is large making them ahead of Olympiacos the most popular Greek team in Greece is due to the fact AEK are a refugee club which many Greek Cypriots are after the Turkish invasion of Cyprus and due to this many Greek Cypriots can relate to the similar history of AEKs being a refugee club. AEK have also a strong following in Australia, the US, UK, Germany and France.
The most hardcore supporters of AEK are Original 21, which is the largest group fan organisation of the club and are known for their loyal and passionate support.

Supporters friendships
A so-called "triangle of brotherhood" has developed between the largest left-wing fan clubs of AEK, Marseille and Livorno. The connection is mostly an ideological one.
Also, AEK's and St. Pauli's left-wing fans, have a strong friendship and their connection is mostly for ideological reasons.

There is an informal friendship and fraternization between the fans of AEK and Fenerbahçe. In the 2017 Euroleague final, Fenerbahçe S.K. supporters displayed a banner which read "Same City's Sons"

Club anthem

AEK's club anthem, Embrós tis AEK Palikária (Advance AEK's Lads), was composed by Stelios Kazantzidis. The lyrics were written by Christos Kolokotronis. The most-popular version of the anthem is sung by ex-football player Mimis Papaioannou.

AEK club anthem

Rivalries

AEK FC's biggest rivalries are with Panathinaikos and Olympiacos.
Against their city neighbours Panathinaikos, they contest the Athens local football derby. The rivalry started not only because of both competing for the major titles, but also because of the refugee ancestry of a big part of AEK fans and, by contrast, that Panathinaikos was considered in general the representative of the Athenian high-class society.
The rivalry with Piraeus based club Olympiacos stems from the rivalry between two of the most successful Greek football clubs. The rivalry was particularly inflamed after 1996, when AEK former star player and then-manager Dušan Bajević moved to Olympiacos, and most recently after the controversial 2007–08 Super League which was awarded to Olympiacos.

Honours and achievements

Domestic competitions
Leagues:
Super League (First Tier)
  Winners (12): 1938–39, 1939–40, 1962–63, 1967–68, 1970–71, 1977–78, 1978–79, 1988–89, 1991–92, 1992–93, 1993–94, 2017–18 
Football League (Second Tier)
  Winners (1): 2014–15
Gamma Ethniki (Third Tier)
  Winners (1): 2013–14 (Group 6)

Cups:
Greek Cup
  Winners (15): 1931–32, 1938–39, 1948–49, 1949–50, 1955–56, 1963–64, 1965–66, 1977–78, 1982–83, 1995–96, 1996–97, 1999–2000, 2001–02, 2010–11, 2015–16

Greek Super Cup
  Winners (2): 1989, 1996
Greek League Cup
  Winners (1) (record): 1990

Doubles
 Winners (2): 1938–39, 1977–78

European competitions
 European Cup
 Quarter-finals (1): 1968–69

UEFA Cup
  Semi-finals (1): 1976–77

UEFA Cup Winners' Cup
 Quarter-finals (2): 1996–97, 1997–98

 Balkans Cup
  Runners-up (1): 1966–67

Regional competitions
Athens FCA First Division
  Winners (5): 1940, 1943, 1946, 1947, 1950
Pre-Mediterranean Cup
  Winners (1) (record): 1991

Tournaments
Sydney Festival of Football
  Winners (1) (record): 2010
 Nova Supersports Cup
  Winners (1) (joint record): 1999
  Runners-up (2): 2000, 2001

Source: AEK Athens F.C.

European performance

Best seasons

UEFA ranking

Players

Current squad

Reserves and Academy

Out on loan

Statistics and records

Domestic and European records

One-club men

Super League top scorers
AEK has a remarkable tradition in strikers and goal-scoring players. 14 different teams' players, 24 times overall, have finished the season as the top scorer in the Super League.

Player records
 Most club appearances: 593–Stelios Manolas
 Most club goals: 299–Mimis Papaioannou

Manager records
 Most club titles: 8–Dušan Bajević

Contribution to the Greece national team
AEK, through its history, has highlighted some of the greatest Greek players in the history of Greece football, who contributed also to the Greece national team (Papaioannou, Nestoridis, Mavros, Tsiartas, Nikolaidis, etc.).

Five players of the club were part of the golden team of 2004 that won the UEFA Euro 2004:

 UEFA Euro 2004 (5): Theodoros Zagorakis (player of the tournament), Vasilios Tsiartas, Michalis Kapsis, Kostas Katsouranis and Vasilios Lakis.

A total of 112 players of AEK had played for the Greece national football team up to 20 November 2022.

Player list

Notable former players

Personnel

Ownership and current board

Executives

Administration Department

Football Department

Coaching and medical staff

Coaching staff

Medical staff

Other staff

Presidents

Notable managers

Key
* Served as caretaker manager.† Served as caretaker manager before being appointed permanently.

Only competitive matches are counted. Wins, losses and draws are results at the final whistle; the results of penalty shootouts are not counted.

See also

 A.E.K. (sports club)
 AEK Athens F.C. Academy
 History of AEK Athens F.C.
 List of AEK Athens F.C. seasons
 List of AEK Athens F.C. records and statistics
 List of AEK Athens F.C. managers
 AEK Athens F.C. in European football
 European Club Association

References

Bibliography
 Κουσουνέλος, Γιώργος (1924). ΑΕΚ - Η ΥΠΕΡΟΜΑΔΑ . Αθήνα, Ελλάδα:	Σ. Φίλης.
 Μακρίδης, Παναγιώτης (1955). Η ΙΣΤΟΡΙΑ ΤΗΣ ΑΕΚ . Αθήνα, Ελλάδα: Αθλητική Ηχώ.
 Συλλογικό έργο (1979). Η αθλητική δράση των Ρωμιών της Πόλης 1896–1976 . Κωνσταντινούπολη, Τουρκία: Ειδική Έκδοση.
 Αλεξανδρής, Γ.Χ. (1996). Η Ιστορία της ΑΕΚ . Αθήνα, Ελλάδα: Ιδιωτική Έκδοση Γ.Χ. Αλεξανδρής.
 Καραπάνος, Παναγιώτης (1999). Το αλφαβητάρι της ΑΕΚ: Όλα όσα πρέπει να ξέρεις και δεν σου έχουν πει για την ΑΕΚ . Αθήνα, Ελλάδα: Εκδόσεις Δίαυλος. .
 Νόταρης, Ι. Σωτήρης (2002). ΑΕΚ, κλασικός αθλητισμός: Ο καρπός της αθλητικής παράδοσης της Πόλης στη σύγχρονη Αθήνα από το 1924 έως τις μέρες μας . Αθήνα, Ελλάδα: Εκδόσεις Καλαβρία. 
 Συλλογικό έργο (2007). Ο Κιτρινόμαυρος Δικέφαλος . Αθήνα, Ελλάδα: Εκδόσεις Παπαδόπουλος. .
 Κατσαρός, Κωνσταντίνος (2008). Κώστας Νεστορίδης: Ο μάγος της μπάλας . Αθήνα, Ελλάδα: Εκδόσεις Άγκυρα. .
 Συλλογικό έργο (2009). ΑΕΚ: Για πάντα πρωταθλητές . Αθήνα, Ελλάδα: Εκδόσεις Σκάι. .
 Κακίσης, Σωτήρης (2011). Ένωσις! . Λευκωσία, Κύπρος: Εκδόσεις Αιγαίον. .
 Έρτσος, Γεράσιμος (2015). Στάδιο ΑΕΚ και η ιστορία του...από το 1928 μέχρι το 2015 . Αθήνα, Ελλάδα: Ιδιωτική Έκδοση. .
 Συλλογικό έργο (2014). 90 ΧΡΟΝΙΑ, Η ΙΣΤΟΡΙΑ ΤΗΣ ΑΕΚ . Αθήνα, Ελλάδα: Εκδοτικός Οίκος Α. Α. Λιβάνη. .
 Συλλογικό έργο (2017). Ποιος, ποιος, ποιος, ο μαύρος θεός . Αθήνα, Ελλάδα: Εκδόσεις Ελληνοεκδοτική. .
 Αγγελίδης, Νικόλαος (2017). Όλες οι ΑΕΚ του κόσμου . Αθήνα, Ελλάδα: Εκδόσεις Νότιος Άνεμος. .
 Γεωργάκης, Θεόδωρος (2021). Είναι διαφορετικό να είσαι ΑΕΚ . Αθήνα, Ελλάδα: Όστρια Βιβλίο. .
 Παναγιωτακόπουλος, Παναγιώτης (2021). 1963-2021 ΤΟ ΤΑΞΙΔΙ ΣΥΝΕΧΙΖΕΤΑΙ . Αθήνα, Ελλάδα: .
 Παναγιωτακόπουλος, Παναγιώτης (2022). 1979-2003 ΤΟ ΤΑΞΙΔΙ ΣΥΝΕΧΙΖΕΤΑΙ...Νο2 . Αθήνα, Ελλάδα: .

External links

Official websites
 Official website 
 AEK Athens at Super League Greece 
 AEK Athens at UEFA
 AEK Athens at FIFA
News sites
 AEK Athens on aek365.org 
 AEK Athens news from Nova Sports
Media
 AEK Athens on Facebook
 AEK Athens on YouTube
Other
 AEK Athens e-shop

 
Football
Football clubs in Athens
Association football clubs established in 1924
1924 establishments in Greece